Shinnakano Dam   is a gravity dam located in Hokkaido Prefecture in Japan. The dam is used for flood control and water supply. Its catchment area is 17.5 km2. The dam impounds about 18 ha of land when full and can store 3340 thousand cubic meters of water. The construction was started on 1971 and completed in 1984.

References

Dams in Hokkaido